Eric Jones may refer to:

Sir Eric Malcolm Jones (1907–1986), British intelligence officer
Eric Jones (economic historian) (born 1936), British-Australian economist and historian
Eric Jones (footballer, born 1915) (1915–1985), English football player and manager
Eric Jones (footballer, born 1931), English football player
Eric Jones (racing driver) (born 1977), American racing driver
Eric Jones (Road Rules), TV personality
Eric Jones (climber) (born 1935), Welsh rock-climber, mountaineer and base jumper
Eric Jones (comics) (1971–2022), American comic book artist
Eric S. Jones (1914–1982), magistrate and politician in Newfoundland, Canada
Eric Jones (rugby league), rugby league footballer of the 1930s, 1940s, and 1950s

See also
Erik Jones (born 1996), American racing driver